Winston School may refer to:

Winston School (Lakeland, Florida), on the National Register of Historic Places
The Winston School, a private coeducational day school in Dallas, Texas

See also
Winston Churchill High School (disambiguation)